Dongkang College is a private technical college in the Buk-gu district of Gwangju metropolitan city, in southwestern South Korea.  The current president is Kim Kyong Taek (김경택).  About 110 instructors are employed.

Academics
The college offers technical training in the fields of technology, humanities, social science, home economics, and education.

History

The school was founded by Lee Weon Myo (이원묘) as Kwangju Dongshin Vocational School (동신실업전문학교).  It opened its doors in 1976, with a student body of 320.  The school became a junior college in 1979.  The name Dongkang College was adopted in 1998.

Sister schools

The college has entered into international exchange relations with institutions in Taiwan (Damsui Technical and Commercial Junior College) and the United States (Washburn State University and Dongguk Royal University).

See also
List of colleges and universities in South Korea
Education in South Korea

External links
Official school website, in Korean
Official school website, in English

Universities and colleges in Gwangju
Buk District, Gwangju
Educational institutions established in 1976
1976 establishments in South Korea